Jean-Claude Labonte (born 23 September 1957) is a Seychellois boxer. He competed in the men's lightweight event at the 1984 Summer Olympics.

References

1957 births
Living people
Seychellois male boxers
Olympic boxers of Seychelles
Boxers at the 1984 Summer Olympics
Place of birth missing (living people)
Lightweight boxers